Sakadeh or Sakdeh may refer to:
 Sakadeh, Fars
 Sakdeh, Kohgiluyeh and Boyer-Ahmad